Blessed Jacopone da Todi is a fragment of a fresco by Paolo Uccello, dating to early in 1436. It shows the Franciscan Jacopone da Todi and was originally located to the right of the altar in the Cappella dell'Assunta in Prato Cathedral. In 1967 it was moved to the Museo dell'Opera del Duomo and at the end of the 1990s it was moved to the Museo Civico, where it is displayed in the "I Tesori della città" gallery.

Bibliography
Annarita Paolieri, Paolo Uccello, Domenico Veneziano, Andrea del Castagno, Scala, Firenze 1991. 
Alessandro Angelini, Paolo Uccello, il Beato Jacopone da Todi e la datazione degli affreschi di Prato, in "Prospettiva", 61, 1991, pp. 49-53
Luciano Bellosi, Le arti figurative, in Prato, storia di una città 1**, Comune di Prato - Le Monnier, 1991, pp…
F. Borsi-S. Borsi, Paolo Uccello, Milano 1992
Claudio Cerretelli, Prato e la sua Provincia, I ed., Prato 1995
Anna Padoa Rizzo, La Cappella dell'Assunta nel Duomo di Prato, Martini, Prato 1997
Mauro Minardi, Paolo Uccello, Rizzoli, Milano 2004.

Church frescos in Prato
1430s paintings
Paintings by Paolo Uccello
Books in art